Shorapur Legislative Assembly constituency is one of the 224 Legislative Assembly constituencies of Karnataka state in India.

It is part of Yadgir district and is reserved for candidates belonging to the Scheduled Tribes.

Members of the Legislative Assembly

Election results

2018

See also
 List of constituencies of the Karnataka Legislative Assembly
 Yadgir district

References

Yadgir district
Assembly constituencies of Karnataka